Saint-Symphorien is a commune in the Ille-et-Vilaine department in Brittany in northwestern France.

Saint-Symphorien was part of Hédé from 1973 to 2007. On 1 January 2008, the commune of Hédé was divided again and the commune was recreated.

Population

See also
Communes of the Ille-et-Vilaine department

References

External links

Mayors of Ille-et-Vilaine Association 

Communes of Ille-et-Vilaine